In Etruscan mythology, Voltumna or Veltha was the chthonic (relating to or inhabiting the underworld) deity, who became the supreme god of the Etruscan pantheon, the deus Etruriae princeps, according to Varro.  Voltumna's cult was centered in Volsini (modern-day Orvieto), a city of the Etruscan civilization of central Italy. Voltumna is shown with contrasting characteristics, such as a maleficent monster, a chthonic vegetation god of uncertain sex, or a mighty war god.

The bond of the twelve Etruscan populi was renewed annually at the sacred grove of Fanum Voltumnae, the sanctuary of Voltumnus sited near Volsinii (present day Bolsena), which was mentioned by Livy. At the Fanum Voltumnae ludi were held, the precise nature of which, whether athletic or artistic, is unknown.

In the Roman Forum, near the Temple of Castor and Pollux stood a shrine dedicated to Voltumna in the Vicus Tuscus.
 
He was the equivalent of the Roman Vertumnus.

See also
Tinia

Notes

References
Briquel, Dominique  2003 "Le Fanum Voltumnae: remarques sur le culte fédéral des cités étrusques", in Dieux, fêtes, sacré dans la Grèce et la Rome antiques,  edited by André Motte and Charles Ternes: 133–59. (Brepols, Turnhout). The last ten pages of this paper contain a highly technical discussion of the identity of the Etruscan god Voltumna in relation to the Latin gods Vertumnus and Janus.
Fontana Elboj, Gonzalo, 1992. Ager: estudio etimológico y functional sobre Marte y Voltumna (University of Zaragoza) (Spanish) 
Hederich, Benjamin. (1770) 1996. Gründliches Mythologisches Lexikon (Darmstadt) 
Pliny 8, 20.
Vollmer,Mythologie aller Völker, (Stuttgart) 1874. 
L. Niebuhr, Römische Geschichte 2, 216. 
Wissowa, Religion und Cultus des Römer, 243, 3. 
Müller-Deecke, Die Etrusker, 1, 329 skk. 
Theodor Mommsen, Römisches Staatsrecht, 3, 666
Pallottino, Massimo. "The Religion of the Etruscans"

Etruscan gods
Etruscan religion
Nature gods